The 2014 Troféo Dolly Campeonato Brasileiro de Turismo (Brazilian Touring Championship)  also known as Stock Car Brasil Light is the second season of the new Stock Car Brasil second tier championship replacing Copa Chevrolet Montana.

Teams and drivers
All cars are powered by V8 engines and use JL chassis. All drivers were Brazilian-registered.

Race calendar and results
All races were held in Brazil.

Championship standings
Points system
Points were awarded for each race at an event, to the driver/s of a car that completed at least 75% of the race distance and was running at the completion of the race, up to a maximum of 48 points per event.

Qualifying races: Used for the first of each event.
Feature races: Used for the second race of each event and singles round.
Final race: Used for the last round of the season with double points.

Drivers' Championship

Notes:
‡ Half points were awarded for the Tarumã race as less than 75% of the race distance had been completed

References

External links

Campeonato Brasileiro de Turismo
Stock Car Brasil